Muhammad Shahrin Islam Chowdhury, also known by his daak naam Tuhin, is a Bangladesh Nationalist Party politician and former Member of Parliament for Nilphamari-1. He is the nephew of former Prime Minister of Bangladesh Khaleda Zia.

Early life and family
Shahrin Islam Tuhin was born in Rajshahi, to a Bengali Muslim family. His ancestral home is in the village of Gomnati, Domar, Nilphamari District. His father, Rafiqul Islam Chowdhury, was a professor of economics and dean at the University of Rajshahi. Tuhin's mother, Shelina Islam, is the eldest sister of former Prime Minister of Bangladesh Khaleda Zia and the descendant of Murad Khan, a 16th-century Middle Eastern immigrant.

Career
Tuhin formerly served as the president of the Nilphamari District branch of the Bangladesh Nationalist Party, a political party founded by President Ziaur Rahman, the husband of his maternal aunt. He took part in the February 1996 Bangladeshi general election as a Bangladesh Nationalist Party candidate, and successfully won a seat in parliament for the Nilphamari-1 constituency.

He also competed in the elections of June 1996 and 2001, but was unable to win a seat in either. In 2016, Tuhin was made a member of the executive committee in the Bangladesh Nationalist Party.

References

Bangladesh Nationalist Party politicians
Living people
6th Jatiya Sangsad members
Year of birth missing (living people)
People from Nilphamari District
21st-century Bengalis
Bangladeshi people of Middle Eastern descent